Georges Mauduit (born 3 December 1940) is a French former alpine skier who competed in the 1968 Winter Olympics.

References

External links
 
 

1940 births
Living people
French male alpine skiers
Olympic alpine skiers of France
Alpine skiers at the 1968 Winter Olympics
Sportspeople from Chambéry